Atlit or Athlit may refer to:

Places
 Atlit, an historical fortified town in Israel, also known as Château Pèlerin
 Atlit (modern town), a nearby town in Israel

Media
Athlit (album), an ambient music album by Oöphoi
Atlit (film), a 2014 Franco-Israeli film

Military
Atlit naval base
Atlit detainee camp